Goldie's Brae (now 4 Goldies Brae and sometimes referred to as "the banana house" or "crescent house") is a historic building in Wadestown, Wellington, New Zealand classified as a "Category I" ("places of special or outstanding historical or cultural heritage significance or value") historic place by the New Zealand Historic Places Trust. It is considered remarkable for its relatively new construction material, concrete, and its eccentricity of design. It was designed by its original owner Dr Alexander Johnston, the Provincial Surgeon of Wellington.

Architect
Alexander Johnston M.D. (c.1825—1895) was coroner and (Wellington) Provincial Surgeon in charge of the Provincial Hospital in Thorndon for twenty-five years until 1879.

He retired in 1889 and returned to England settling in London where he died in September 1895 aged 70.

Wellington's first Colonial Hospital was built on land donated by Māori for that purpose (now the site of Thorndon's Wellington Girls' College) and was opened in September 1847. The medical officer in charge was Colonial Surgeon Dr John Patrick Fitzgerald. The surgery and other offices were on the ground floor. A ward for eight to ten patients was on the first floor of the brick and plaster building.

Following a bad earthquake in 1848 a new single storey wooden building was built in 1852 which provided for 40 patients. It became Provincial Hospital on the establishment of Wellington Province in January 1853.

Dr Johnston replaced Fitzgerald in 1854 and served there for 25 years. In the 1870s ten acres were set aside in Newtown for a very much larger Wellington Hospital. It was completed and Thorndon's patients moved there in the winter of 1881.

Description
1882 
"To Be Let, that delightfully situated Villa Residence, known as Goldie's Brae, Wadestown, the property of Dr Johnston, with about five acres of land, ornamentally laid out and planted, and the whole commanding a magnificent view of the city and harbour. The house contains drawing, dining, and morning rooms, five bedrooms, kitchen etc., all on the ground floor, and fitted with every modern convenience. Stable, cart-house, and other out-offices. Large garden and orchard, with numerous fruit trees in full bearing. A never-failing spring of pure water is laid on to the house.

1894 
"To Be Let or Sold, that fine property . . . four acres . . . large house, cottage, and stable, all built of concrete. The view of the harbour is unsurpassed . . ."

1982
A segmental plan form with a continuous glazed gallery or conservatory providing internal access and solar heating to each of its ten rooms.

Subdivision
A road was constructed across the property from Grant Road, it is now Grosvenor Terrace but was then named Queen's Terrace, and J H Bethune & Co auctioned ten building sites within the property in July 1904.

References

External links
Heritage New Zealand
Photo from ground level

Buildings and structures in Wellington City
Heritage New Zealand Category 1 historic places in the Wellington Region
1870s architecture in New Zealand